Glyptothorax exodon is a species of sisorid catfish. It is only known from the drainage basin of the Kapuas River, Borneo.

This species can be readily distinguished from most other Glyptothorax species of the region by its slender body. The only possible confusion is with Glyptothorax platypogonides (as which this species was originally misidentified) and Glyptothorax siamensis but G. exodon can be identified by its relatively large eye, uniformly mottled colour without distinct pale stripes and a large area of premaxillary teeth visible when the mouth is closed.
This species of catfish possesses suction cups under its belly to allow itself to stick to smooth surfaces on the river bed, thus, allowing it to resist the fierce currents of the Kapuas River system.  This species grows to a length of  SL.

References
  (2005): Glyptothorax exodon, a new species of rheophilic catfish from Borneo (Teleostei: Sisoridae). Raffles Bulletin of Zoology 53(2): 251–255. PDF fulltext

Glyptothorax
Freshwater fish of Borneo
Taxa named by Heok Hee Ng
Taxa named by Ike Rachmatika
Fish described in 2005